Armand "Bep" Guidolin (December 9, 1925 – November 24, 2008) was a Canadian ice hockey player and coach. He is notable for being the youngest player in National Hockey League history. He was born in Thorold, Ontario. He and Eleanor, his wife of 62 years, had four children. His family moved to Timmins, Ontario.

Guidolin stood 5'8" at 175 lbs, and was a left-shooting left winger in the NHL. He later went on to a coaching career. He was nicknamed "Bep" because his mother spoke Italian and very little English.  Armand was the baby of the family and his mother pronounced baby as "beppy". The nickname stuck and was shortened to "Bep". He is the cousin of fellow NHL player and coach Aldo Guidolin.

Early life
Guidolin and his family moved to Timmins when he was young. It was there that he learned how to skate at the age of 13. His abilities excelled through practicing on local outdoor rinks. When the NHL lost many of their talented players to the second world war, Guidolin talents caught the eyes of pro scouts as being a viable replacement option.

Playing career
Guidolin played junior hockey with the Oshawa Generals of the OHA, playing in the Memorial Cup in 1942. Later that year he became the youngest player (16 years, 11 months) to play in an NHL game, on November 12, 1942.

His quick rise to the NHL was a direct result of World War II. The Boston Bruins were in dire need of replacements to fill the roster holes created by so many players leaving for military service. In 1944, his eligibility for military service brought a one-year break from his NHL career.

Guidolin also played for the Detroit Red Wings and the Chicago Black Hawks. Armand was an ardent supporter for the formation of a players' union, which led to an early demise to his NHL career in 1952. He played for nine years in the minors, then retired to a coaching career.

Coaching career
Guidolin coached the Belleville McFarlands, winning the Allan Cup in 1958, and the World Championship in 1959. In 1965 he became the coach of his former junior team the Oshawa Generals, featuring 17-year-old future Hockey Hall of Fame defenceman Bobby Orr. He led the Generals to the Memorial Cup final in 1966 versus the Edmonton Oil Kings. Guidolin later coached the London Knights of the OHL, Boston Bruins and the Kansas City Scouts of the NHL, the Edmonton Oilers of the World Hockey Association, and the Boston Braves and Philadelphia Firebirds of the American Hockey League. It was a dream of Guidolin's to coach in the NHL, which became a reality when he got the opportunity to coach the Boston Bruins midway through the 1972–73 season, when he was bench boss for 26 games.  He coached Boston again in 1973–74, leading the Bruins to the Stanley Cup Finals. Guidolin also coached the Kansas City Scouts for the 1974–75 and 1975–76 campaigns. (Legree, 2018).

Guidolin also coached the Timmins Northstars of the Northland Intermediate Hockey League which went on to the Hardy Cup Finals for the All Canadians.

Career statistics

Regular season and playoffs

Coaching statistics

NHL

 - replaced mid-season
 – mid-season replacement

WHA

WOJBHL

OHA

AHL

OHL

OHASr

References

External links
 

1925 births
2008 deaths
Boston Bruins coaches
Boston Bruins players
Brantford Alexanders coaches
Canadian ice hockey coaches
Canadian ice hockey left wingers
Chicago Blackhawks players
Detroit Red Wings players
Edmonton Oilers coaches
Ice hockey people from Ontario
Canadian people of Italian descent
Kansas City Scouts coaches
London Knights coaches
Oshawa Generals players
Oshawa Generals coaches
Ottawa Senators (QSHL) players
People from Thorold
World Hockey Association coaches